The Primetime Emmy Award for Outstanding Writing for a Variety Series debuted in 1966, and has been annually awarded most years since the mid-1960s. It has had a large number of name changes, mostly involving the addition or subtraction of the word comedy. Generally, the category has recognized the writers of variety and sketch comedy shows. However, in 1969, 1970 and 1979, it was the main category for writers of situation comedies. Prior to 1966, variety series were eligible in Outstanding Writing for a Comedy Series where The Red Skelton Show and other variety programs were occasionally nominated.

For most of the 1970s, the category was effectively split into two branches. From 1971 to 1978, one-off specials were awarded separately from ongoing series. The divide was reinstated in 2009 as Outstanding Writing for a Variety Special. The writers of one-off variety specials competed against series writers in the interim, and occasionally won, as in 1991 and 2000. This has led to some anomalies, such as when a special edition of Late Night with David Letterman beat out regular editions of The Tracey Ullman Show and Saturday Night Live in 1987, despite the fact that typical episodes of Late Night were not nominated that year.

The category eventually found greater stability with its name in 1982, when it settled on Outstanding Writing for a Variety or Music Program for almost two decades. In 2000, it added the word comedy. Of all the writing Emmy categories, it has recently become the one most dominated by cable networks. Since 1996 it has been won by a major terrestrial broadcaster only twice, with the overwhelming majority of winners coming from HBO and Comedy Central.

The category has seen many name changes, including variety, musical and comedy series. The current name dates from 2012. Since 2003, and with the exception of 2007, three series have shared the awards: The Daily Show and its spin-off, The Colbert Report, both broadcast on Comedy Central, and Last Week Tonight with John Oliver, himself a Daily Show alumnus.

The following list of winners is organized both by year and the name being used by the category in that year:

Winners and nominations

1950s

1960s

1970s

1980s

1990s

2000s

2010s

2020s

Programs with multiple wins

9 wins
 The Daily Show with Jon Stewart

7 wins
 Last Week Tonight with John Oliver

5 wins
 The Carol Burnett Show

4 wins
 The Colbert Report
 Dennis Miller Live
 Late Night with David Letterman
 Saturday Night Live

2 wins
 SCTV Network

Programs with multiple nominations

28 nominations
 Saturday Night Live

16 nominations
 Late Show with David Letterman

15 nominations
 The Daily Show with Jon Stewart

14 nominations
 Late Night with Conan O'Brien
 Late Night with David Letterman

12 nominations
 The Carol Burnett Show

10 nominations
 The Colbert Report

9 nominations
 SCTV Network

8 nominations
 Last Week Tonight with John Oliver

6 nominations
 Dennis Miller Live
 The Late Show with Stephen Colbert
 Real Time with Bill Maher

5 nominations
 Full Frontal with Samantha Bee
 Rowan & Martin's Laugh-In
 The Tonight Show Starring Johnny Carson

4 nominations
 The Chris Rock Show
 Late Night with Seth Meyers
 The Muppet Show
 Portlandia
 The Tracey Ullman Show

3 nominations
 The Flip Wilson Show
 In Living Color
 Inside Amy Schumer
 Key & Peele
 The Kids in the Hall
 Politically Incorrect with Bill Maher
 The Sonny & Cher Comedy Hour

2 nominations
 A Black Lady Sketch Show
 The Daily Show with Trevor Noah
 The Danny Kaye Show
 Mr. Show with Bob and David
 Mystery Science Theater 3000
 The Smothers Brothers Comedy Hour
 Tracey Takes On...

Notes

References

Writing, Variety, Music, or Comedy
Screenwriting awards for television
Awards established in 1957
1957 establishments in the United States